Sandra O'Brien is a Republican member of the Ohio Senate representing the 32nd district. She was elected in 2020, defeating Democratic incumbent Sean O'Brien with just under 51% of the vote.

References

Living people
Republican Party Ohio state senators
21st-century American politicians
21st-century American women politicians
People from Ashtabula County, Ohio
Bowling Green State University alumni
Edinboro University of Pennsylvania alumni
Year of birth missing (living people)